is a Japanese footballer currently playing for Thespakusatsu Gunma.

Career 
Tokiwa is a product of FC Tokyo's youth academy. At under-18 level, Tokiwa scored 15 goals in the 2005 J Youth Cup; the domestic league for under-18 youth players in Japan.

Upon graduating Tokyo University of Agriculture, Tokiwa joined Mito HollyHock in 2010. He made his J. League debut on 4 April 2010 against Kashiwa Reysol, and scored his first goal in a 2–1 victory against Oita Trinita on 1 September.

On 13 December 2012, Tokiwa completed a permanent move to Tokyo Verdy.

Career statistics
Updated to 23 February 2016.

References

External links 
 

 Profile at Thespakusatsu Gunma

1987 births
Living people
Tokyo University of Agriculture alumni
Association football people from Tokyo
Japanese footballers
J2 League players
Mito HollyHock players
Giravanz Kitakyushu players
Tokyo Verdy players
Roasso Kumamoto players
Thespakusatsu Gunma players
Association football forwards